Manikganj is a district in central Bangladesh. It is a part of the Dhaka Division,  In 1845 AD it was at first declared as a sub-division. It was at first, under Faridpur district (Faridpur Zila) then it was included under Dhaka district (Dhaka Zila) in 1956 for the administrative purposes. In 1984 Manikganj was declared as a full district.

History
Manikganj was established in 1845 as a subdivision of Dhaka District.

War of Liberation
Liberation war in 1971 in Manikganj District was organized and led by Abdul Halim Chowdhury, Abdul Matin Chowdhury, Principal Abdur Rouf Khan and other heroes of the district.

During October 1971, at the Northwest corner of Golaidanga village, Baldhara union in Singair upazila, a group of Freedom Fighters attacked the boats carrying the Pakistani intruding soldiers and a terrible battle occurred on the Nuruni ganga (canal of Kaliganga river).Eighty one Pak soldiers were killed and many others held with injuries in a fierce battle with freedom fighters at Golaidanga village in Singair upazila on 29 October. Freedom fighter Engr Tobarak Hossain Ludu led the operation. He was the commander of muktibahini Lodu group. None of the Mukti Bahini Freedom Fighters were killed during this battle which is one of the significant liberation fight against Pakistani military in Manikgonj. After this short duration battle, the Mukti Bahini Freedom Fighters leave the battle field and the PAK soldiers enhanced their strength bringing more soldiers and they burnt 160 houses surrounding area of Golaidanga village of the battle place and killed 09 local people who were mostly elderly stayed at home. Some local young boys helped freedom fighters in that ambush. After golaidanga fight Singair upozilla became free from Pak occupied army on 13 November 1971. In the last week of November in 1971, fresh groups of freedom fighters entered different areas of Manikganj and defeated Pakistani troops in a few battles. On 14 December 1971, a group of Pakistan Bahini moving toward Dhaka entered into Barundi village under Manikganj Sadar upazila, a group of liberation forces (Mujib Bahini) under leadership of Shahadat Hossain Biswas Badal were preparing to attack them within a suitable place. Understanding this, the Pakistani Soldiers immediately left the village leaving two soldiers from their troops. One of them was arrested by the liberation forces (Mujib Bahini) at night on 14 December 1971 and another was arrested by the same group of freedom fighters next day after a small fight. Finally they declared the then sub-division free on 13 December.

It was turned into a district in 1984.

Daulatpur-Saturia tornado
On 26 April 1989, Manikganj was the site of the Daulatpur–Saturia tornado, which became the deadliest tornado in recorded history. 1,300 people were initially reported as having been killed with 12,000 injured. The towns of Saturia and Manikganj Sadar were leveled and about 80,000 people were made homeless.

Geography

Manikganj is a district in Dhaka Division. Annual average temperatures reach a maximum of 36 °C and a minimum to 12.7 °C with the annual rainfall total being .

Rivers
There are quite a few rivers in the Manikganj District.
The names of the some important rivers of this district are as follows:
The Padma
The Kaliganga
The Jamuna
The Dhaleshwari
The Ichamati

Population

According to the 2011 Bangladesh census, Manikganj District had a population of 1,392,867, of which 676,359 were males and 716,508 were females. Rural population was 1,264,157 (90.76%) while urban population was 128,710 (9.24%). Manikganj had a literacy rate 49.20% for the population 7 years and above: 52.59% for males and 46.05% for females.

Religion

90.62% are Muslims, 9.34% are Hindus. The district of Manikganj has 3575 mosques, 160 temples, 10 churches, five Buddhist temples and a pagoda. The Hindu population has fallen from its 1981 level of nearly 150,000 to 130,000 in 2011.

Economy

There are total 166 Haats and Bazars. Besides 54 fairs (Mela) are held in Manikganj. "Manikganj Bijoy Mela"-(Manikganj), "Bahadia Boishakhi Mela,(Bahadia) "Joymontop Modhor Mela,(Joymontop) Bahadia Bazar "Majhi Barir Mela"-(Diabari), "Zinda Shah Mela"-(Jhitka), "Belal/Billal Paglar Mela"-(Harganj), "Rowth Jatra Mela"-(Katigram), "Kanu Promaniker Mela (Manta, Manikganj Sadar)", "Sadur Mela (Singair)", "Poush Mela"-(Atigram),"Baher Paglar Mela"-(Bangala), "Baher Paglar Mela"-(Mohadebpur), "Sadhur Mela"-( South Jamsha), "Sadhinota Mela"-(Maluchi), "Aziz paglar Mela"- (kachidhara), " Baruni Mela"- (Butni), "Afaz Paglar Mela (Bathaimuri),are famous and favorite all over Manikganj. Mohadebpur Bazar, Barangail Bazar, Ghosta Baza, Baira Bazar, Jhitka Bazar, jamsha bazar, Diabari Bazar, Gilonda Bazar, Gheor Bazar, Singair Bazar, Bangala Bazar, Maluchi Bazar(Balla bazar), Intazganj Bazar,Butni Bazar are famous bazar in manikganj.

Places of interest
 Baliati Zamindari Home, Saturia

 Padmar Par, Harirampur
 Teota Jamindar Bari, Shivalaya upazila 
 Taota Noboratna Modh, Shibalaya
 Narayan Sadhur Asrom
 Historical Shrine and Mosque of Machaine Village
 Kabiraj Bari
Beutha Bridge
 Betila Palace 
 Betila Mondir

Subdivisions
The upazilas are:

 Manikganj Sadar Upazila
 Singair Upazila
 Shivalaya Upazila 
 Saturia Upazila
 Harirampur Upazila
 Ghior Upazila 
 Daulatpur Upazila.

Education

There is one medical school in the district, Colonel Malek Medical College.

A private university, NPI University of Bangladesh, is planned.

There are 27 colleges in the district. They include Government Debendra College, founded in 1942.

According to Banglapedia, Baliati Iswar Chandra High School, founded in 1919, Barangail Gopal Chandra High School (1924), Dhankora Girish Institution (1917), Dhulla B. M. High School (1920), Ghior D. N. Pilot High School (1929), Ibrahimpur Iswar Chandra High School (1923), Jamirtta S. G. High School (1921), Jhitka Ananda Mohan High School (1926), Joymontop High School (1921), Kellai Monsur Uddin ML High School (1956), Manikganj Government High School (1884), Muljan High School, Manikganj (1978), Manikganj Model High School (1925), Nali Bararia Krishna Chandra High School (1915), Patgram Anath Bandhu Government High School (1915), Teota Academy (1891), and Terosree K. N. Institution (1922), Bajpara high school (1995), Hatipara High School, Diabari High School are notable secondary schools.

The madrasa education system includes two fazil madrasas and one kamil madrasa, Manikganj Islamia Kamil Madrasa, founded in 1953.

The technical education system includes the Government Textile Vocational Institute Manikganj.

Notable residents
 Khan Asifur Rahman Agun, singer
 Begum Badrunnessa Ahmed, politician and social worker, was raised by the zamindar of Paril.
 Naib Uddin Ahmed, photographer, was born in Paril village in 1925.
 Rafiq Uddin Ahmed, Bengali language movement martyr, was born in Paril village in 1926.
 Mir Quasem Ali, war criminal, was born in Munshidangi village in 1952.
 Momtaz Begum, singer and politician, was elected to Parliament from constituency Manikganj-2.
 Amalendu Biswas, stage actor, lived in Jabar village.
 Aruna Biswas, television and film actress, calls Manikganj her hometown.
 Parbati Sankar Roy Choudhury, zamindar, administered his family's estates from Teota.
 Abdul Halim Chowdhury, politician, was born in Elachipur village in 1928.
 Bulbul Chowdhury, dancer, attended Manikganj High School.
 Munier Choudhury, educator, dramatist, and literary critic, was born in Manikganj in 1925.
 , Zamindar, was born in Dhulla village in 1869.
 Sumita Devi, actress, was born in Manikganj district in 1936.
 Nina Hamid, folk singer 
 Khandaker Delwar Hossain, politician, was elected to Parliament from constituency Manikganj-1.
 Khandkar Manwar Hossain, statistician 
 A. K. M. Nurul Islam, Vice President of Bangladesh (1986–1989), is buried in Harirampur.
 Mohammad Kaykobad, computer scientist, graduated from Manikganj Government High School and Debendra College.
 Mohammad Ali Reza Khan, ornithologist, graduated from Manikganj Debendranath College.
 Mubarak Ahmad Khan, scientist 
 Muhammad Siddiq Khan, librarian, was principal of Manikganj Debendra College.
 Shamsul Islam Khan, Bangladeshi Minister of Industry (1991–1996), was elected to Parliament from constituency Manikganj-4.
 Shamsuzzaman Khan, academician and folklorist, was born in Manikganj district.
 Zahid Maleque, Bangladeshi Minister of Health and Family Welfare, was elected to Parliament from constituency Manikganj-3.
 Tareque Masud, film director and producer, died in a crash on the N5 highway at Joka.
 Mishuk Munier, journalist, died in a crash on the N5 highway at Joka.
 Khan Ataur Rahman, actor, filmmaker, and composer, was born in Ramkantapur village in 1928.
 Naimur Rahman Durjoy, cricketer and politician, was born in Manikganj in 1974.
 Kaniz Fatema Roksana, first Bangladeshi women pilot
 Kiran Chandra Roy, folk singer, attended Patgram Anath Bandhu High School and Manikganj Debendra College.
 Ranadaprasad Saha, businessman, established Debendra College in 1942.
 Dinesh Chandra Sen, educator, writer, and folklorist, was born in Bogjuri village in 1866.
 Hiralal Sen, filmmaker, was born in Bogjuri village in 1866.
 Amartya Sen, economist, made a few visits to his ancestral home (on his mother's side) in Manikganj.

See also 
 Districts of BangladeshNahar Garden, Saturia

Notes

References

 
Districts of Bangladesh